Miriam Janisch was a South African born educational administrator. As Assistant Director of Education in Kenya from 1943 to 1957, she expanded educational provision for girls in Kenya.

Life
Miriam Janisch graduated at the University of the Witwatersrand before studying anthropology at the University of Cambridge. She matriculated at Newnham College, Cambridge in 1934. Returning to South Africa, she taught at the Jeppe High School for Girls, lectured in English at the Johannesburg College of Education, and worked for eight years as a Social Research Officer for Non-European and Native Affairs in Johannesburg. In 1940 she undertook detailed research on black family income and expenditure in the city. 

In 1943 she joined the Colonial Education Service, working for the Education Department in Kenya. There she was also active in the East Africa Women’s League. In 1947, as Assistant Director of Education in Kenya, she spoke at the first Conference on the Education of Women and Girls. She was still Assistant Director of Education in Kenya in the early 1950s, and received an OBE for her achievements there in 1957.

In 1960 she became Warden of Women Students at the University of Nairobi.

Works
 A study of African income and expenditure in 987 families in Johannesburg, January-November, 1940’’, Johannesburg, 1941.
 'Some administrative aspects of native marriage problems in an urban area', Bantu Studies, Vol. 15, Issue 1, 1941
 'Educating Young Nations', Nature'', vol. 188, 1960, pp.262–263.

References

Year of birth missing
Year of death missing
Education in Kenya
People from Johannesburg
University of the Witwatersrand alumni
Alumni of Newnham College, Cambridge
Educational administrators
Colonial Education Service officers
Officers of the Order of the British Empire